Caresto is a Swedish car company which was started in 2004 by Leif Tufvesson.

Caresto is registered in Ängelholm in southern Sweden (Vegeå Tegelbruk, Rodervägen, SE 262 94, Ängelholm). Leif Tufvesson is the founder and creator of 4 (2 different, and 2 of a kind) of its Hot Rod sports car, used by Volvo in different car shows, such as SEMA, as well as a limited edition of an individualized Volvo C70 hardtop convertible.

Leif Tufvesson previously worked for the Volvo Concept Center and for six years he was responsible for the development department of Koenigsegg, a Swedish sports car manufacturer. In 2004 he won the prestigious "Hot Rod of the Year" award from Hot Rod Magazine and "Most Innovative Car" in the USA.

External links
Caresto Automotive

Car manufacturers of Sweden